A  is a Japanese transverse flute or fue. The various types include the Komabue, Nōkan, Ryūteki, and Shinobue.

These flutes have an extra closed chamber (for improved timbre and tonal qualities) that extends past the chin to the left shoulder and can be used as a rest in the same way as violins are rested on the left shoulder.

See also
Bamboo musical instruments

Yokobue in media
David Carradine carried a yokobue in Quentin Tarantino's Kill Bill movies and Bruce Lee's The Silent Flute.

Side-blown flutes
Japanese musical instruments
Bamboo flutes